Bromshall railway station was a short lived railway station in Staffordshire, England.

The railway line between Stoke-on-Trent and Uttoxeter was opened by the North Staffordshire Railway (NSR) in 1848 and a station to serve the village of Bramshall (also known as Bromshall) was opened at the same time.

The station was never heavily used and after only 17 years the NSR withdrew the passenger service on the last day of 1865 although the goods facilities were retained.

In 1942, an ordnance storage depot was constructed nearby and new sidings laid to enable munitions produced at Cold Meece ordnance factory to be moved to Bromshall depot by rail. Between May and September 1942, a temporary station called Bromshall Crossing was opened on the site to allow construction workers to travel to and from work.

References
Notes

Sources

Further reading

Disused railway stations in Staffordshire
Former North Staffordshire Railway stations
Railway stations in Great Britain closed in 1865
Railway stations in Great Britain opened in 1848